Jay Warren Martin (born September 8, 1944) is an American former ski jumper. In 1968 he won the national title, and placed 43rd in the large hill event at the 1968 Winter Olympics. In retirement he worked for the Minneapolis Ski Club, and was active as a ski judge. His younger brother Jerry also became an Olympic ski jumper.

References

1944 births
Living people
American male ski jumpers
Olympic ski jumpers of the United States
Ski jumpers at the 1968 Winter Olympics